The Insurance Regulatory and Development Authority of India (IRDAI) is a statutory body under the jurisdiction of Ministry of Finance , Government of India and is  tasked with regulating and licensing the insurance and re-insurance industries in India. It was constituted by the Insurance Regulatory and Development Authority Act, 1999, an Act of Parliament passed by the Government of India. The agency's headquarters are in Hyderabad, Telangana, where it moved from Delhi in 2001.

IRDAI is a 10-member body including the chairman, five full-time and four part-time members appointed by the government of India.

History 
In India insurance was mentioned in the writings of many historical documents, which examined the pooling of resources for redistribution after fire, floods, epidemics and famine. The life-insurance business began in 1818 with the establishment of the Oriental Life Insurance Company in Calcutta; the company failed in 1834. In 1829, Madras Equitable began conducting life-insurance business in the Madras Presidency. The British Insurance Act was enacted in 1870, and Bombay Mutual (1871), Oriental (1874) and Empire of India (1897) were founded in the Bombay Presidency. The era was dominated by British companies.

In 1914, the government of India began publishing insurance-company returns. The Indian Life Assurance Companies Act, 1912 was the first statute regulating life insurance. In 1928 the Indian Insurance Companies Act was enacted to enable the government to collect statistical information about life- and non-life-insurance business conducted in India by Indian and foreign insurers, including provident insurance societies. In 1938 the legislation was consolidated and amended by the Insurance Act, 1938, with comprehensive provisions to control the activities of insurers.

The Insurance Amendment Act of 1950 abolished principal agencies, but the level of competition was high and there were allegations of unfair trade practices. The Government of India decided to nationalise the insurance industry.

An ordinance was issued on 19 January 1956, nationalising the life-insurance sector, and the Life Insurance Corporation was established that year. The LIC absorbed 154 Indian and 16 non-Indian insurers and 75 provident societies. The LIC had a monopoly until the late 1990s, when the insurance industry was reopened to the private sector.

General insurance in India began during the Industrial Revolution in the West and the growth of sea-faring commerce during the 17th century. It arrived as a legacy of British occupation, with its roots in the 1850 establishment of the Triton Insurance Company in Calcutta. In 1907 the Indian Mercantile Insurance was established, the first company to underwrite all classes of general insurance. In 1957 the General Insurance Council (a wing of the Insurance Association of India) was formed, framing a code of conduct for fairness and sound business practice.

Eleven years later, the Insurance Act was amended to regulate investments and set minimum solvency margins and the Tariff Advisory Committee was established. In 1972, with the passage of the General Insurance Business (Nationalisation) Act, the insurance industry was nationalized on 1 January 1973. One hundred seven insurers were amalgamated and grouped into four companies: National Insurance Company, New India Assurance Company, Oriental Insurance Company and United India Insurance Company. The General Insurance Corporation of India was incorporated in 1971, effective on 1 January 1973.

The re-opening of the insurance sector began during the early 1990s. In 1993, the government set up a committee chaired by former Reserve Bank of India governor R. N. Malhotra to propose recommendations for insurance reform complementing those initiated in the financial sector. The committee submitted its report in 1994, recommending that the private sector be permitted to enter the insurance industry. Foreign companies should enter by floating Indian companies, preferably as joint ventures with Indian partners.

Following the recommendations of the Malhotra Committee, in 1999 the Insurance Regulatory and Development Authority (IRDA) was constituted to regulate and develop the insurance industry and was incorporated in April 2000. Objectives of the IRDA include promoting competition to enhance customer satisfaction with increased consumer choice and lower premiums while ensuring the financial security of the insurance market.

The IRDA opened up the market in August 2000 with an invitation for registration applications; foreign companies were allowed ownership up to 26 percent. The authority, with the power to frame regulations under Section 114A of the Insurance Act, 1938, has framed regulations ranging from company registrations to the protection of policyholder interests since 2000.

In December 2000, the subsidiaries of the General Insurance Corporation of India were restructured as independent companies and the GIC was converted into a national re-insurer. Parliament passed a bill de-linking the four subsidiaries from the GIC in July 2002. There are 28 general insurance companies, including the Export Credit Guarantee Corporation of India and the Agriculture Insurance Corporation of India, and 24 life-insurance companies operating in the country. With banking services, insurance services add about seven percent to India’s GDP.

In 2013 the IRDAI attempted to raise the foreign direct investment (FDI) limit in the insurance sector to 49 percent from the existing 26 percent. The FDI limit in the insurance sector has been raised to 74 percent according to the 2021 union budget.

Structure

Section 4 of the IRDAI Act 1999 specifies the authority's composition. It is a ten-member body consisting of a chairman, five full-time and four part-time members appointed by the government of India. At present ( January,  2023 ), the authority is chaired by Mr. Debasish Panda  and its full-time members are Mrs T.L.Alamelu, K.Ganesh, Pournima Gupte, Praveen Kutumbe and Sujay Banarji.

Functions
The functions of the IRDAI are defined in Section 14 of the IRDAI Act, 1999, and include:
 Issuing, renewing, modifying, withdrawing, suspending or cancelling registrations 
 Protecting policyholder interests
 Specifying qualifications, the code of conduct and training for intermediaries and agents
 Specifying the code of conduct for surveyors and loss assessors 
 Promoting efficiency in the conduct of insurance businesses
 Promoting and regulating professional organisations connected with the insurance and re-insurance industry 
 Leaving fees and other charges
 Inspecting and investigating insurers, intermediaries and other relevant organisations 
 Regulating rates, advantages, terms and conditions which may be offered by insurers not covered by the Tariff Advisory Committee under section 64U of the Insurance Act, 1938 (4 of 1938) 
 Specifying how books should be kept 
 Regulating company investment of funds 
 Regulating a margin of solvency 
 Adjudicating disputes between insurers and intermediaries or insurance intermediaries 
 Supervising the Tariff Advisory Committee 
 Specifying the percentage of premium income to finance schemes for promoting and regulating professional organisations 
 Specifying the percentage of life- and general insurance business undertaken in the rural or social sector
Specifying the form and the manner in which books of accounts shall be maintained, and statement of accounts shall be rendered by insurers and other insurer intermediaries.

Insurance repository
The prime minister of India announced an insurance repository system, helping policyholders buy and maintain insurance policies in electronic form rather than on paper. Insurance repositories, like share depositories or mutual fund transfer agencies, will hold electronic records of insurance policies issued to individuals as electronic policies or e-policies.

References

External links
 Website

1999 in law
2000 in India
Economic history of India (1947–present)
Insurance in India
Regulatory agencies of India
Vajpayee administration initiatives
Insurance organizations
Insurance regulation
Government agencies of India
Government agencies established in 1999
1999 establishments in Andhra Pradesh